Bank Fold is a hamlet near Belthorn in Lancashire, England.

Villages in Lancashire
Geography of Blackburn with Darwen